Rinzia rubra is a plant species of the family Myrtaceae endemic to Western Australia.

It blooms from August to November producing white flowers.

It is found in a small area on undulating plains in the Goldfields-Esperance region of Western Australia just north of Esperance where it grows in sandy soils.

References

rubra
Endemic flora of Western Australia
Myrtales of Australia
Rosids of Western Australia
Vulnerable flora of Australia
Plants described in 1986
Taxa named by Malcolm Eric Trudgen